The California Golden Bears are the athletic teams that represent the University of California, Berkeley. Referred to in athletic competition as California or Cal, the university fields 30 varsity athletic programs and various club teams in the National Collegiate Athletic Association (NCAA)'s Division I primarily as a member of the Pac-12 Conference, and for a limited number of sports as a member of the Mountain Pacific Sports Federation (MPSF). Over the course of the school's history, California has won team national titles in 13 men's and 3 women's sports and 111 team titles overall. Cal athletes have also competed in the Olympics for a host of different countries. Notable facilities used by the Bears include California Memorial Stadium (football) and Haas Pavilion (basketball and other indoor sports). Cal finished the 2010–11 athletic season with 1,219.50 points, earning third place in the Director's Cup standings, the Golden Bears' highest finish ever. Cal did not receive any points for its national championships in rugby and men's crew because those sports are not governed by the NCAA. Cal finished 12th in the 2014-15 standings.

In 2014, Cal instituted a strict academic standard for an athlete's admission to the university. By the 2017 academic year 80 percent of incoming student athletes were required to comply with the University of California general student requirement of having a 3.0 or higher high school grade point average.

California's nickname originated in 1895 during California's dominant track and field team's tour of Midwest and Eastern universities. A blue silk banner with the golden grizzly bear, the state symbol, was displayed by the team during that tour. Since then, Cal's athletic teams have been known as the Golden Bears.

Varsity programs

Men's varsity programs

Football

The California football team began play in 1885 and has played its home games at California Memorial Stadium since 1923, except for in 2011 while the stadium was being renovated; the team played at San Francisco's AT&T Park that season. The Bears have five national titles bestowed retrospectively by "major selectors" — 1920, 1921, 1922, 1923 and 1937 (a contemporaneous selector in 1937 also chose California) — listed by the NCAA. The team also has produced two of the oddest and most memorable plays in college football: Roy "Wrong Way" Riegels' fumble recovery and run toward the Cal goal line in the 1929 Rose Bowl; and The Play in the 1982 Big Game, a game-winning, five-lateral kickoff return as time expired.

The program has produced numerous NFL stars, including:
two Pro Football Hall of Fame enshrinees in Les Richter and Tony Gonzalez, the latter of whom is the NFL's all-time receptions leader among tight ends. Gonzalez also played basketball at Cal.
two first overall NFL Draft selections in Steve Bartkowski (1975) and Jared Goff (2016).
several All-Pro and Pro Bowl selections or otherwise notable players, including Aaron Rodgers, Joe Kapp, Ryan Longwell, Marshawn Lynch, DeSean Jackson, Desmond Bishop, and Jahvid Best.

Current head coach Justin Wilcox began his tenure in 2017.

California has participated in 25 bowl games, garnering a record of 12–12–1.

Basketball

The California men's basketball team has represented the University of California intercollegiately since 1907 and subsequently began full conference play in 1915. Cal basketball's home court is Haas Pavilion, which was constructed atop of the old Harmon Gymnasium using money donated in the late 1990s in part by the owners of Levi-Strauss. The program has seen success throughout the years culminating in a national championship in 1959 under legendary coach Pete Newell and have reached the final four two other times in 1946 and 1960. The 1926–27 team finished the season with a 17–0 record and was retroactively named the national champion by the Premo-Porretta Power Poll.

The current head coach of the California men's basketball program is Mark Fox. Some notable NBA players that spent time playing in Berkeley include Jaylen Brown, Jason Kidd, Kevin Johnson, and Darrall Imhoff.

Baseball

The Cal baseball team plays at Evans Diamond, located between Haas Pavilion, the Recreational Sports Facility (RSF), and Edward's Track Stadium. Cal has appeared in the post-season a total of nine times, including five times in the College World Series; Cal won the title in 1947 and 1957. The team is currently coached by Mike Neu, who took the helm in 2018.

In September 2010, the university announced that baseball would be one of five sports cut as a cost-cutting measure. However, in April 2011, after receiving more than $9 million in pledges from supporters of the program, the program was reinstated. In June 2011, the team made its most recent appearance in the College World Series.

Perhaps the most famous Cal player was second baseman Jeff Kent, who led the Golden Bears to the 1988 College World Series, and would go on to be named the 2000 National League Most Valuable Player as a member of the San Francisco Giants. Shortstop Geoff Blum of Cal's 1992 College World Series team hit the game-winning home run in the 14th inning of Game 3 of the 2005 World Series for the Chicago White Sox.

Current Golden Bears in Major League Baseball include Oakland Athletics outfielder Mark Canha, Toronto Blue Jays shortstop Marcus Semien, and Chicago White Sox first baseman and left fielder Andrew Vaughn. Vaughn is Cal's highest ever MLB draft selection, having been selected third overall by the White Sox in 2019. San Diego Padres manager Bob Melvin also played at Cal, having helped the team earn third place in the 1980 College World Series.

Bowling (discontinued)
Men's bowling was a varsity-level intercollegiate sport at the University of California in the 1970s and won a national championship in 1979, governed by the ABC (now the U.S. Bowling Congress).

Crew
Crew (rowing) has a long and storied history as the oldest sport at the university, beginning with the formation of the University of California Boat Club in 1875. Competitive racing as known today began in 1893.

National champions:
Varsity 8 (18): 1928, 1932, 1934, 1935, 1939, 1949, 1960, 1961, 1964, 1976, 1999, 2000, 2001, 2002, 2006, 2010, 2016, 2022
Second varsity 8 (10): 1941, 1947, 1951, 1959, 1999, 2001, 2002, 2003, 2014, 2019
Freshman 8 (9): 1938, 1982, 1998, 2000, 2004, 2005, 2007, 2008, 2011
Third varsity 8 (1): 2014
Varsity 4 with coxswain (4): 2001, 2002, 2007, 2009

Cross country
The University of California's intercollegiate cross country team is under the direction of head coach Bobby Lockhart, who took over the program in 2019 after spending time at UNC-Chapel Hill and Oklahoma State. 

The California Golden Bears men's cross country team appeared in the NCAA tournament five times, with their highest finish being 16th place in the 2007–08 school year.

Rifle (discontinued)
Men's rifle began intercollegiate competition at the University of California in the 19th century and won 5 national championships in the 1950s. At that time, the national event required five firing members per team, one alternate, a team captain and a coach. The national championship competition consisted of ten shots per firing member at 50 feet, indoors.

Rugby

Cal also competes in the Collegiate Rugby Championship (CRC), the highest profile college rugby sevens tournament in the US. The CRC is held every June at PPL Park in Philadelphia and is broadcast live on NBC. Cal reached the finals of the 2010 CRC, losing to Utah in the finals in sudden death extra time, and finished third in the 2012 CRC. Cal won the 2013, 2014, 2015 and 2016 CRC titles.

In September 2010, the university announced that rugby would be one of five varsity sports cut as a cost-cutting measure, though the team would have continued to represent the university as a "varsity club sport." A large group of rugby supporters organized to oppose the relegation. On February 11, 2011, the administration reversed its decision on rugby and two other sports, thus continuing them as sponsored varsity sports.

Soccer

Men's soccer began intercollegiate competition at the University of California in 1906 and has won no national championships and 4 conference championships. The team currently plays its home games at Edwards Stadium and the head coach (in his 12th season) is Kevin Grimes. Steve Birnbaum was the #2 pick in the first round in the 2014 MLS SuperDraft.

The California Golden Bears men's soccer team has an NCAA Division I Tournament record of 14–19 through nineteen appearances.

Tennis 

Doug Eisenman won the NCAA Division I doubles title with Matt Lucena in 1990.

Water polo
The California Golden Bears men's water polo team have an NCAA Division I Tournament record of 58–15 through twenty-nine appearances.

Women's varsity programs

Volleyball

The California Golden Bears women's volleyball team have an NCAA Division I Tournament record of 26–17 through seventeen appearances. Despite appearing in the NCAA national championship game in 2010, they have yet to win a national title. Some former Bears that have gone pro include all-time kills leader Hana Cutura, former US Olympian and all-time assists leader Carli Lloyd, Mia Jerkov, Lara Vukasovic, Jenelle Jordan, and Maddie Haynes. The team is currently coached by Sam Crosson.

Basketball

California's women's basketball team has made 14 NCAA tournament appearances, their best result being a Final Four appearance in 2013. The team has also won one WNIT championship, in 2010.

In 2009–10, under Joanne Boyle, the Bears's top-10 recruiting class and star senior Alexis Gray-Lawson) rebounded from a rough start to their season to win the WNIT. The championship game against  Miami (FL) was the first ever championship game held at Haas Pavilion. Gray-Lawson ended her career as the all-time Cal leader in three points made and games played.

In 2012–13, under second-year head coach Lindsay Gottlieb, the Cal women reached a record AP and USA Today Coaches Poll #6 ranking at the end of the season, earning the 2 seed in the Spokane region of the NCAA tournament. The Bears reached the first Final Four in school history. In June 2019, Gottlieb became the first NCAA women's head coach to be hired to an NBA coaching staff when she became an assistant coach for the Cleveland Cavaliers.

The current women's basketball head coach is Charmin Smith. Notable alumni of the team include first-round WNBA draft selections Layshia Clarendon and Kristine Anigwe. Anigwe holds the team's all-time scoring and rebounding records.

Softball

In 2002, the Cal softball team won its first National Championship against Arizona. Some notable players include Candace Harper, third baseman, and Jocelyn Forest, pitcher, both of whom were team captains. The 2002 Women's College World Series took place in Oklahoma City, Oklahoma. Softball began intercollegiate competition at the University of California in 1972. The team has won one national championship and 6 conference championships. The team currently plays at the 1,204 seat Levine-Fricke Field in Strawberry Canyon, and the current head coach is former Cal shortstop Chelsea Spencer, who was a member of the 2002 WCWS-winning team.

Note: Both Cal and the NCAA consider appearances at the AIAW women's final tournament (which was also named and promoted as the "Women's College World Series"), prior to the first NCAA softball WCWS on May 27–30, 1982, to be equivalent to NCAA WCWS appearances.

Cross country
The California Golden Bears women's cross country team appeared in the NCAA tournament four times, with their highest finish being 9th place in the 1988–89 school year.

Field hockey
Cal was a member of the Northern Pacific Field Hockey Conference (NorPac) from the league's founding in 1982 until its demise at the end of the 2014 season. The four NorPac members from California (Cal, Pacific, Stanford, and UC Davis) became single-sport members of the America East Conference starting with the 2015 season.

The California Golden Bears women's hockey team have an NCAA Division I Tournament record of 1–10 through ten appearances.

Rowing
The 1980 Cal women's crew dominated the national collegiate championships. They won the varsity eight, Cal's first ever varsity national championship in any women's sport, and also captured the varsity four and finished second in the junior varsity eight. The Bears also captured national titles in the varsity four in 1981 and the novice eight in 1984. The team won NCAA championships in 2005, 2006, 2016 and 2018.

Soccer
Women's soccer began intercollegiate competition at the University of California in 1982 and has won no national championships and 1 conference championship. The team currently plays at Edwards Stadium and the head coach (in his 5th season) is Neil McGuire. Notable alums include Olympic Gold Medalist and 2015 and 2019 World Cup Champion Alex Morgan, and Betsy Hassett of the New Zealand Women's National Team.

The California Golden Bears women's soccer team has an NCAA Division I Tournament record of 16–25 through twenty-five appearances.

Water polo
Women's Water Polo began intercollegiate competition at the University of California in 1996 and has won no national championships and 2 conference championships. The team currently plays at the Spieker Aquatics Complex near Haas Pavilion and the head coach (in her 2nd season) is Coralie Simmons.

Championships

Appearances

The California Golden Bears competed in the NCAA tournament across 26 active sports (12 men's and 14 women's) 627 times at the Division I Level.

 Baseball (13): 1947, 1957, 1980, 1985, 1988, 1991, 1992, 1995, 2001, 2008, 2010, 2011, 2015, 2019
 Men's basketball (19): 1946, 1957, 1958, 1959, 1960, 1990, 1993, 1994, 1996, 1997, 2001, 2002, 2003, 2006, 2009, 2010, 2012, 2013, 2016
 Women's basketball (16): 1982 (AIAW), 1990, 1992, 1993, 2006, 2007, 2008, 2009, 2012, 2013, 2014, 2015, 2016, 2017, 2018, 2019
 Men's cross country (5): 2007, 2008, 2010, 2015, 2016
 Women's cross country (4): 1984, 1988, 2011, 2017
 Field hockey (12): 1980 (AIAW), 1981 (AIAW), 1982, 1983, 1992, 1993, 1994, 2001, 2002, 2003, 2005, 2006
 Men's golf (15): 1939, 1948, 1949, 1995, 1998, 1999, 2000, 2004, 2010, 2011, 2012, 2013, 2014, 2016, 2019
 Women's golf (10): 2001, 2002, 2003, 2004, 2005, 2006, 2011, 2014, 2015, 2017
 Men's gymnastics (48): 1948, 1949, 1950, 1951, 1952, 1953, 1954, 1955, 1956, 1957, 1959, 1960, 1961, 1962, 1963, 1964, 1966, 1967, 1968, 1969, 1970, 1973, 1974, 1975, 1976, 1982, 1996, 1997, 1998, 2000, 2001, 2002, 2003, 2004, 2005, 2006, 2007, 2008, 2009, 2010, 2011, 2012, 2013, 2014, 2015, 2018, 2019, 2021, 2022
 Women's gymnastics (15): 1992, 1996, 1997, 1998, 2001, 2003, 2004, 2007, 2013, 2014, 2015, 2016, 2017, 2018, 2019, 2022
 Rowing (21): 1999, 2000, 2001, 2002, 2003, 2004, 2005, 2006, 2007, 2008, 2009, 2010, 2011, 2012, 2013, 2014, 2015, 2016, 2017, 2018, 2019
 Men's soccer (20): 1960, 1977, 1981, 1983, 1985, 1986, 1996, 2001, 2002, 2003, 2004, 2005, 2006, 2007, 2008, 2010, 2013, 2014, 2017, 2019
 Women's soccer (26): 1983, 1984, 1986, 1987, 1988, 1993, 1998, 1999, 2000, 2001, 2002, 2004, 2005, 2006, 2007, 2008, 2009, 2010, 2011, 2012, 2013, 2014, 2015, 2016, 2017, 2019
 Softball (35): 1980 (AIAW),  1981 (AIAW), 1982 (AIAW), 1986, 1987, 1988, 1989, 1990, 1991, 1992, 1993, 1994, 1995, 1996, 1997, 1998, 1999, 2000, 2001, 2002, 2003, 2004, 2005, 2006, 2007, 2008, 2009, 2010, 2011, 2012, 2013, 2015, 2016, 2017, 2018
 Men's swimming and diving (56): 1943, 1947, 1951, 1952, 1956, 1957, 1959, 1963, 1968, 1970, 1972, 1975, 1976, 1977, 1978, 1979, 1980, 1981, 1982, 1983, 1984, 1985, 1986, 1987, 1988, 1989, 1990, 1991, 1992, 1993, 1994, 1995, 1996, 1997, 1998, 1999, 2000, 2001, 2002, 2003, 2004, 2005, 2006, 2007, 2008, 2009, 2010, 2011, 2012, 2013, 2014, 2015, 2016, 2017, 2018, 2019
 Women's swimming and diving (37): 1983, 1984, 1985, 1986, 1987, 1988, 1989, 1990, 1991, 1992, 1993, 1994, 1995, 1996, 1997, 1998, 1999, 2000, 2001, 2002, 2003, 2004, 2005, 2006, 2007, 2008, 2009, 2010, 2011, 2012, 2013, 2014, 2015, 2016, 2017, 2018, 2019
 Men's tennis (37): 1977, 1978, 1979, 1980, 1981, 1982, 1983, 1986, 1987, 1988, 1989, 1990, 1991, 1995, 1996, 1997, 1998, 2000, 2001, 2002, 2003, 2004, 2005, 2006, 2007, 2008, 2009, 2010, 2011, 2012, 2013, 2014, 2015, 2016, 2017, 2018, 2019
 Women's tennis (37): 1982 (AIAW), 1983, 1984, 1985, 1986, 1987, 1988, 1989, 1990, 1991, 1992, 1993, 1994, 1995, 1996, 1997, 1998, 1999, 2000, 2001, 2002, 2003, 2004, 2005, 2006, 2007, 2008, 2009, 2010, 2011, 2012, 2013, 2014, 2015, 2016, 2017, 2019
 Men's indoor track and field (17): 1968, 1989, 1990, 1992, 1994, 1995, 1997, 2007, 2008, 2009, 2010, 2011, 2013, 2014, 2017, 2018, 2019
 Women's indoor track and field (12): 1990, 2001, 2004, 2006, 2007, 2008, 2009, 2011, 2012, 2016, 2021, 2022
 Men's outdoor track and field (79): 1922, 1930, 1931, 1934, 1935, 1936, 1937, 1938, 1939, 1940, 1941, 1942 1943, 1946, 1947, 1948, 1949, 1950, 1951, 1952 1953, 1954, 1956, 1957, 1958, 1959, 1960, 1961, 1962, 1963, 1964, 1965, 1966, 1967, 1968, 1970, 1971, 1973, 1974, 1975, 1976, 1977, 1979, 1980, 1981, 1982, 1983, 1984, 1985, 1986, 1987, 1988, 1990, 1991, 1992, 1993, 1994, 1995, 1996, 1997, 1998, 1999, 2000, 2001, 2002, 2004, 2005, 2006, 2007, 2008, 2009, 2010, 2011, 2012, 2015, 2017, 2019, 2021, 2022
 Women's outdoor track and field (29): 1982, 1983, 1984, 1985, 1986, 1987, 1988, 1989, 1990, 1992, 1995, 1996, 1997, 1998, 1999, 2000, 2001, 2002, 2004, 2005, 2006, 2007, 2008, 2011, 2012, 2016, 2019, 2021, 2022
 Women's volleyball (18): 1981 (AIAW), 1982, 1983, 1987, 1988, 1989, 2002, 2003, 2004, 2005, 2006, 2007, 2008, 2009, 2010, 2011, 2012, 2013
 Men's water polo (29): 1969, 1973, 1974, 1975, 1977, 1978, 1979, 1980, 1981, 1982, 1983, 1984, 1986, 1987, 1988, 1989, 1990, 1991, 1992, 1993, 1994, 1995, 2002, 2006, 2007, 2010, 2015, 2016, 2017
 Women's water polo (7): 2010, 2011, 2014, 2015, 2017, 2019

Team
The Golden Bears of California earned 40 NCAA championships at the Division I level, plus 5 unofficial men's football titles claimed by the school.

Men's (31)
 Baseball (2): 1947, 1957
 Basketball (1): 1959
 Golf (1): 2004
 Gymnastics (4): 1968, 1975, 1997, 1998
 Outdoor track and field (1): 1922
 Swimming and diving (7): 1979, 1980, 2011, 2012, 2014, 2019, 2022
 Water polo (15): 1973, 1974, 1975, 1977, 1983, 1984, 1987, 1988, 1990, 1991, 1992, 2006, 2007, 2016, 2021
Women's (9)
 Rowing (4): 2005, 2006, 2016, 2018
 Softball (1): 2002
 Swimming (4): 2009, 2011, 2012, 2015

Results

Below are 71 national team titles in current and former California varsity sports that were not bestowed by the NCAA:

 Men (69)
Bowling (1): 1979
Crew  (18): 1928, 1932, 1934, 1935, 1939, 1949, 1960, 1961, 1964, 1976, 1999, 2000, 2001, 2002, 2006, 2010, 2016, 2022
 Football (5*): 1920, 1921, 1922, 1923, 1937
Rifle (9): 1898, 1899, 1902, 1907, 1952, 1955, 1957, 1958, 1959
Rugby (27): 1980, 1981, 1982, 1983, 1985, 1988, 1991, 1992, 1993, 1994, 1995, 1996, 1997, 1998, 1999, 2000, 2001, 2002, 2004, 2005, 2006, 2007, 2008, 2010, 2011, 2016, 2017
Rugby 7s (5) (CRC): 2013, 2014, 2015, 2016, 2017
Tennis (2**): 1925, 1926
Tennis (indoor) (2): 1980, 1989
 Women (2)
Crew (1): 1980
Tennis (indoor) (1): 2016

* Football: as determined by one contemporary and seven retrospective "major selectors" listed in the NCAA Football Bowl Subdivision Records (five of the eight selectors being math systems).
** Unofficial, by virtue of winning both the collegiate individual and doubles crowns of the U.S. Lawn Tennis Association

Below are 60 national team titles won by California club sports teams at the highest collegiate level in non-NCAA sports:

Men (10)
Badminton (1†): 2010
Hurling (1): 2013
Sailing (match racing) (1): 1975
Taekwondo (3): 1976, 1977, 1982
Triathlon (4†): 2004, 2006, 2008, 2009
Women (5)
Badminton (2†): 2008, 2010
Sailing (dinghy) (1): 1978
Taekwondo (1): 1976
Ultimate (1): 1993
Combined (45)
Archery (2): mixed recurve – 2016; mixed barebow – 2016
Badminton (5†): 2000, 2009, 2013, 2015, 2019
Cycling (road) (3‡): 2002, 2003, 2004
Taekwondo (28): 1986, 1990, 1991, 1992, 1993, 1994, 1995, 1996, 1997, 1998, 1999, 2000, 2001, 2002, 2004, 2005, 2006, 2007, 2008, 2009, 2010, 2011, 2012, 2014, 2015, 2016, 2017, 2018 (tie)
Team Tennis (WTT format) (4): 2010, 2012, 2014, 2015
Triathlon (3†): combined – 2008; team relay – 2012, 2014

† For this sport, some years may be missing from this list and hence remain uncounted.
‡ Cal also won the individual women's title at the 2002 intercollegiate cyclo-cross championship held in Yountville, California, and hosted by Cal. In addition, Cal men finished in places 2, 7, 9 and 15. It is unclear whether a team champion was declared. If so, Cal would have won the title.

Individual

California Golden Bears have won 255 all-time individual championships, including doubles, rowing crews and relay events, in sports currently governed at the Division I level by the NCAA. The eight men's tennis titles won before 1946 were bestowed by the U.S. Lawn Tennis Association. 
The four women's tennis titles won in 1929–1931 were bestowed at the National Collegiate Girls' Tennis Championships. The four women's rowing titles won in the 1980s were bestowed by the National Women's Rowing Association. The names of the nine women who won the 1984 women's novice eights rowing title have not been retrieved.

Notable club sports

Ice hockey
California Ice Hockey Team is an ACHA Division II program, competing in the Pacific 8 Intercollegiate Hockey Conference. The team is coached by Chris Linden, who took over as head coach in 2018.

Volleyball
The University of California department of athletics sponsors a varsity women's volleyball program without a men's equivalent program at the NCAA/varsity level; therefore, California only competes in intercollegiate men's volleyball at the club level. Along with the men's club volleyball program, there is also a women's club team separate from the women's varsity team. According to the UC Berkeley Recreational Sports page, the club men's volleyball program has won a total of six national championships. Occasionally, members of the club volleyball team will help the women's varsity volleyball team with practices and open scrimmages.

Taekwondo
The California taekwondo team has won 32 national team championships from 1976 through 2018 (includes 3 men's and one women's team titles prior to the adoption of overall scoring).

Athletic facilities

California Memorial Stadium

California Memorial Stadium is the home field for California's football program. The venue opened in 1923 and seated between 72,000 and 80,000 fans until the 2010 football season (its final configuration before the renovation seated 71,799), making it northern California's largest football stadium in terms of seating capacity; however, the stadium's capacity dropped to 62,467 seats after the renovation was completed.

Simpson Center
The Simpson Center (known as the Student Athlete High Performance Center or SAHPC during construction) is the new high-performance center for California's student athletes, located right next to California Memorial Stadium on Piedmont Avenue. The new center opened in the fall of 2011 and by January 2012, the final team (football) had moved into the facility. The Simpson Center is home to 13 of California's 32 intercollegiate athletic programs, including football, Men's Rugby, Women's Lacrosse, Men's and Women's Gymnastics, Men's and Women's Golf, Men's and Women's Soccer, Men's and Women's Crew, Women's Field Hockey, and softball. According to the University of California, the facility is a  complex that will provide "year round access for over 450 student athletes."

Haas Pavilion

Walter A. Haas, Jr. Pavilion is the home of California's men's and women's basketball, women's volleyball, and men's and women's gymnastics teams. The arena is located in the middle of the main University of California sports complex, overlooking Evans Diamond (baseball) and Edwards Stadium (track/soccer). The arena was originally constructed in 1933 as the Men's Gym. It was renamed, in 1959, Harmon Gym after Oakland financier A.K.P. Harmon, who in 1879 donated the funds to build Cal's first indoor athletic facility. The playing surface, after being known as simply "Room 100" when the arena opened, was renamed Pete Newell Court in 1987 in honor of Pete Newell, who led Cal to the national championship in 1959. Proposals for replacing the old gym were bandied about from the 1970s onward, but sentiment was strongly in favor of its reconstruction. As a result, the arena was heavily renovated from 1997 to 1999 after a donation of about $11 million from Walter A. Haas, Jr. of Levi Strauss & Co., constructing a new seating bowl within the existing walls.

Recreational Sports Facility
The Recreational Sports Facility is a 100,000 square foot athletics center that is attached to Haas Pavilion and is located on Bancroft Avenue. The RSF features many different rooms for many different activities including, but not limited to: basketball, weight lifting, racquetball, handball, squash, volleyball, and badminton. Attached to the facility is the RSF Field House which is home to many of California's club and intramural teams and has, in the past, hosted the Cal women's volleyball team while Haas Pavilion was under construction. Also attached to the RSF is the Spieker Aquatics Complex, which is home to the California men's and women's water polo and men's and women's swimming and diving programs.

Evans Diamond

Evans Diamond is California's baseball stadium, it opened in 1933 and currently has a seating capacity of 2,500. Evans Diamond is located in the UC sports complex in the southwest corner of campus, pressed between Edwards Stadium to the west (right field) and Haas Pavilion to the east. Originally named Edwards Field, it was renamed after Clint Evans, the Cal head coach from 1930 to 1954. The stadium was renovated in 1992 at a cost of $275,000, paid for by the donations of UC alumni. Construction was done by RNT Landscaping, a San Leandro landscaping company. The stadium is considered inadequate to host regional and super regional games for the NCAA tournament because of its lack of lights.

Other facilities

 Oakland Arena (Men's Basketball 1997-1999)
Clark Kerr Sand Courts (Beach volleyball)
Edwards Stadium (Soccer, Track & Field)
Hellman Tennis Complex (Tennis)
Legends Aquatics Center (Swimming and Diving, Water Polo)
Levine-Fricke Field (Softball)
Spieker Aquatics Complex (Water Polo, Swimming & Diving)
T. Gary Rogers Rowing Center (Crew)
Underhill Field (Field Hockey)
Witter Rugby Field (Rugby)

California spirit

School colors and mascot

Blue and gold have been Cal's official colors since 1875. The dark blue represents California's sky and ocean, as well as Yale University, the alma mater of several of the university's founders, including its first president, Henry Durant. Gold is a reference to the state of California's nickname, the "Golden State." The shade of gold varies from a more metallic gold on the university seal, and a yellow-gold (also known as California Gold) that is in use by the athletic department. Because of the university's use of blue and gold, the state of California's de facto colors were blue and gold from around 1913 to 1951 and became the official state colors in 1951.

Since 1895, the athletic teams of the University of California have officially been known as the "California Golden Bears."

University of California Marching Band

The University of California Marching Band, usually shortened to Cal Band, is the marching band for the University of California, Berkeley. While the Cal Band is student-run, it is administered under the auspices of the university and represents Cal at sporting events and social gatherings. The name of the band is "The University of California Band" by the constitution, but is typically called "The University of California Marching Band" or "The Cal Band". When the band marches out of Memorial Stadium's North Tunnel for football pre-games, it is referred to as "The Pacesetter of College Marching Bands, the Pride of California". When in attendance at basketball games or other small sporting events, a smaller subset known as the "Straw Hat Band" represents the UC Marching Band.

Songs

Fight for California
Primary fight song

University of California Rally Committee
The University of California Rally Committee, usually shortened to Rally Comm, is the official guardian of the University of California's spirit and traditions. The committee is in charge of the protection of the Stanford Axe (while Cal is in possession of it), the Bonfire Rally, the Cal flags, the California Victory Cannon, Homecoming Rally, the upkeep of the Big C, and many other spirit related activities. Rally Comm is completely student-run and can be found at almost every major sporting event and many other events throughout the Bay Area and country. The most distinguishing feature of the University of California Rally Committee are the blue and gold striped rugby shirts that serve as the official uniform of the committee.

The Bench
The Bench is the student cheering section for the University of California men's basketball team.  Located inside Haas Pavilion, The Bench holds up to 900 students who cheer on their California Golden Bears at home basketball games. Students who sit on The Bench receive an annual Bench T-shirt each year and continue to make Haas Pavilion one of the loudest basketball arenas in the Pac-12 Conference. The Bench prides itself on standing the entire game and ensuring that the arena is a hostile place for any opposing team to play.

Although exact dates are not known, the tradition of The Bench was drastically changed in October 2000 when renovations on Haas Pavilion were completed and put a row of portable chairs between the student section and the court.  University officials called the move necessary for the protection of referees and players, but students were angry at the move because it further removed them from the action.

Stanford rivalry

California shares a traditional sports and academic rivalry with nearby Stanford University. Both schools operate in the San Francisco Bay Area with the University of California in the East Bay and Stanford in Santa Clara County. While the schools have a rich athletic rivalry with the football programs meeting 124 times, they also share an academic rivalry: the University of California, Berkeley, is commonly considered the best public university nationally while Stanford University is thought of as being one of the best private universities in the country. Athletic events between the two schools are usually signified by being the "Big whatever", examples include: the Big Game (football), Big Tip Off (basketball), Big Spike (Volleyball), Big Splash (Water Polo), Big Meet (Track & Field), Big Freeze (Club Ice Hockey), et cetera. Women's basketball does not follow the normal naming template for games between the two schools and is simply known as "The Battle of the Bay."

The annual football game features both teams vying for the Stanford Axe.

Trophies

Stanford Axe

The Stanford Axe is a trophy awarded to the winner of the annual Big Game, a college football match-up between the University of California Golden Bears and the Stanford University Cardinal. The trophy consists of an axe-head mounted on a large wooden plaque, along with the scores of past Big Games. California is currently in possession of the Axe after winning the 2021 Big Game in Palo Alto.

World Cup
The World Cup is awarded to the winner of the annual rugby union series between the University of California Golden Bears and the University of British Columbia Thunderbirds. In rugby, California's traditional rival is British Columbia, not Stanford, which led to the creation of the World Cup. California was the 2013 World Cup winner, defeating UBC 28–18 in Berkeley on February 16, 2013, and 38–6 in Vancouver on March 24, 2013.

Scrum Axe
Although California's main rival in rugby is British Columbia, the rivalry between California and Stanford in rugby has been going on for more than a century. The trophy awarded to the winner of the California-Stanford rugby match is known as the "Scrum Axe", which is a play on the "Stanford Axe", the trophy awarded to whichever school wins the annual rugby contest. California retained its hold on the Scrum Axe on January 26, 2013, in Berkeley, winning their 17th straight meeting over the Cardinal 176–0.

Olympic representation

Throughout the years, the University of California has been well represented in the Summer Olympic games with Cal athletes winning 90 gold medals, 40 silver medals, and 28 bronze medals. Despite the fact that the university sponsors no sports that compete in the Winter Olympics, California does have 1 gold medalist from the 1928 Winter Games.

At the 2016 Summer Olympics, California's at the time enrolled students won at total of 18 medals, including 9 gold ones. Sixteen of those medals were won in swimming.

References

External links